China Drive is the only daily bi-lingual news and lifestyle radio show in China. It is broadcast seven days a week, 5–7 pm Beijing time on China Radio International and focusses on life in China. The programme has four main presenters.

On Air Personalities

Monday to Wednesday
 Mark Griffiths
 Yan Yinan

Thursday and Friday
 Mark Griffiths
 Ning Yan

Saturday and Sunday
 Yan Yinan
 John Artman

Format of the show
 Hang Out Feature (A reporter, or one of the show's presenters goes to a location in Beijing and does a short report on what's there for visitors to see.)
 Business-related report
 Media Scan - a review of the day's foreign and Chinese newspapers and media websites
 Movie Review with Zhao Kun
 Science & Technology Feature with Li Dong
 This Is IT - fashion feature with Shen Si
 Roundtable Discussion - every Friday an important issue is discussed in depth

Team of Reporters for China Drive
Original Team
 Yan Yinan, Host
 Chris Verrill, Host/Producer
 James West, Business

Ongoing
 Li Dong (Michael Li) 
 Liu Min 
 Wangjing 
 Shen Si

Former Team Members
Chris Verrill Verrill was the first producer and co-host of China Drive.  He spent only one year at CRI.  He later launched Beijing Playhouse, China's English Broadway Theatre, www.beijingplayhouse.com

 James West - Executive Producer of Hack on Triple J

Trevor Metz Trevor was the co-creator and former afternoon host of Real Time Beijing--a sister program to China Drive. He spent four years with CRI. He left the show to narrate the documentary series Discover China on 5CTV https://web.archive.org/web/20090209090658/http://5ctv.tv/

History
China Drive first broadcast on CRI on December 1, 2005.  It was hosted by Yan Yinan and Chris Verrill.  

China Drive broadcast weekdays 5 pm to 7 pm.  It replaced and combined four different half hour shows that were on the air at 5 pm, 5:30 pm 6 pm, and 6:30 pm.  The show was a lighthearted features magazine.

Program Distribution

Webcast
http://english.cri.cn/4026/more/4163/more4163.htm

China Drive first broadcast on CRI on December 1, 2005.  It was originally hosted by Yan Yinan and Chris Verrill.

In China
 87.9 MHz FM in Shanghai
 Easy FM on 91.5 MHz FM in Beijing
 104.7 MHz FM in Guangzhou

In the United States
 WNWR on 1540 kHz AM in Philadelphia
 WUST on 1120 kHz AM in Washington, DC

In Europe
 1440 kHz AM via Marnach, Luxembourg covering most of Europe
 558 kHz across the UK. The morning edition of the show is re-broadcast 9-10pm the day of original transmission. The afternoon edition is aired between 3pm and 5pm the following day.

Chinese radio programs
China Radio International